Kaoru Kakudo (1947 – April 15, 2004) was a violinist, born in Japan, who performed internationally in recital and solo orchestral appearances.  She was a concertmaster of the Rotterdam Philharmonic Orchestra in the Netherlands.

Biography
Violinist Kaoru Kakudo studied at an early age with Etaro Matsubashi. After winning a competition for young musicians and her debut on television, she was admitted to the Tokyo National University of Fine Arts and Music where she studied with Tatsuo Uzuka and Takaoki Ono, before concluding her musical education with Ivan Galamian in New York. She held a post as acting concertmaster of the Rotterdam Philharmonic Orchestra. She had regularly performed as a soloist with her own orchestra and other orchestras and in recitals as well.

References

1947 births
2004 deaths
20th-century Japanese musicians
20th-century classical violinists
Japanese classical violinists
Tokyo University of the Arts alumni
Women classical violinists
20th-century women musicians